Tangelnscher Bach is a river of Saxony-Anhalt, Germany. It flows into the Jeetzel near Beetzendorf.

This river was designated as a nature preserve in 1978

See also
List of rivers of Saxony-Anhalt

References

 UNEP-WCMC (2021). Protected Area Profile for Beetzendorfer Bruchwald Und Tangelnscher Bach from the World Database of Protected Areas, July 2021. www.protectedplanet.net

Rivers of Saxony-Anhalt
Rivers of Germany